The 2010–11 Hyundai Mobis Professional Basketball season was the 15th season of the Korean Basketball League.

Regular season

Playoffs

Prize money
Jeonju KCC Egis: KRW 130,000,000 (champions + regular-season 3rd place)
Busan KT Sonicboom: KRW 100,000,000 (regular-season 1st place)
Wonju Dongbu Promy: KRW 50,000,000 (runners-up)
Incheon ET Land Elephants: KRW 50,000,000 (regular-season 2nd place)

External links
Official KBL website (Korean & English)

2010–11
2010–11 in South Korean basketball
2010–11 in Asian basketball leagues